Arturo Paul Nicholas Cassini, Marquis de Capuzzuchi de Bologna, Count de Cassini (1836–1919), was a Russian aristocrat and lifelong diplomat who served in the Diplomatic Service of the Imperial Russian Government for 55 years during the 19th and early 20th centuries. During his tenure, he served most prominently as Ambassador to China during the Triple Intervention and negotiation for the lease of Port Arthur; as Ambassador to the United States for seven tumultuous years which saw the Spanish–American and Russo-Japanese wars; and as Ambassador to Spain during the Algeciras Conference.

Early life
Arthur Paul Nicholas (or Arturo Pavlovich Nicolas) Cassini was born in 1836 into a noble Russian family of Italian lineage which first entered the service of the Czar during the Napoleonic Wars. His father, Paul Viktorovich Cassini, had served as Russian Consul at Trieste and as a State Counsellor to Venice. Although his titles suggest Italian origin they were, in fact Russian, and by imperial decree of 14 October 1892 Arthur, his brother Michael, and their off-spring were entitled to use the title Count.

Having graduated from the prestigious Imperial Alexander Lyceum in 1854, Cassini entered into Government service on 18 December 1854, by joining the Foreign Office in St. Petersburg at age 18. In 1862 he was granted the title "gentleman of the bedchamber", in 1880—that of "Chamberlain", and on 1 April 1881 he was promoted to "State Councillor".

Cassini married his first wife Julia Nirotmortseva in 1862. This marriage produced one daughter, Maria. After they divorced, he was married to Zoya Dmitrievna Bibikova, until her death in 1906. They had one daughter, Margarita.

Diplomatic career
In 1854 Count Cassini entered Imperial Service in the Ministry of foreign affairs. In 1864 he was attached to the Dresden mission and soon afterward he was promoted to the office of the first secretary of the legation. He held the same position  subsequently at the Russian missions in Baden, Copenhagen and Hamburg.

By 25 September 1884 he was the chargé d'affaires, and on 10 May 1888 Minister Resident at Hamburg. After 10 years at Dresden, on 17 November 1891, Czar Alexander III appointed him to the key post of envoy extraordinary and minister plenipotentiary to the Chinese Imperial Court at Beijing.

Cassini's time in China was marked by fierce great-power competition as each tried to advance and protect their commercial interests in the Middle Kingdom, and Russia—then constructing the Trans-Siberian Railroad and seeking a warm-water port in the far-East—more so than most. Then a seasoned diplomat, upon his arrival at Beijing, Cassini took the apparently unprecedented step of refusing to present his credentials to anyone other than the Emperor himself. Although the Chinese Foreign Office tried to assuage him from that position, he was granted an audience.

Having set out the tone of his mission, when the Sino-Japanese war ended, he led the way for the combination of European powers which compelled Japan to withdraw her demands for territory amongst her war gains. Immediately after, and against the efforts of the British Government he was instrumental in arranging for the acquisition for Russia of long term concession of Port Arthur and Talien Bay on the Liaotung peninsula, as well as rights to link these by railroad to Russian lines. Recognizing the strategic importance of his role, Cassini is said to have told his niece and adoptive daughter Marguerite that "To possess the East, Russia must possess the Liaotung peninsula."

Upon the announcement of his dispatch to Washington, the St. Petersburg Novoye Vremya, offered the following appraisal of the Count's tenure in China:

Service in the United States
Cassini remained ambassador to China until 3 October 1896, and having gained the reputation of an astute, resourceful, and brilliant diplomat, he was appointed Ambassador to the United States in early 1898, shortly after the outbreak of the Spanish–American War. Cassini's tenure in Washington saw a great deal of activity on behalf of his Government as a result of the number of incidents which occurred during his posting—including the Kishinev incident, Russian occupation of Manchuria, and the Russo-Japanese War.

At the outset of his time in Washington, Cassini allegedly saw some coolness to his Government in official circles in the United States as a result of his Government's perceived position with respect to Spain. Cassini advised the Czar that an impartial course between the combatants would be the best one for his Government, and that advice was followed. While that was the case, Cassini's task was not an easy one in light of the fact that Russian actions and interests often conflicted, directly or indirectly, with those of the United States, especially during the Roosevelt Administration, with the result that the Count was not popular with, or trusted by, the President and went to great lengths to defend his Government's actions with both the administration and press. Indeed, Cassini's mendacity on occasion resulted in direct friction with the White House. He was seen as being too much of an old school diplomat, and although his adroitness worked well in Beijing, the American Press reported that this was too much the diplomacy of previous generations and as a result, Cassini "as such was unable to secure the confidence of either the people or the government of the United States".

While that was the case, Cassini's service at Washington was not short lived and he rose to be Dean of the Diplomatic Corps there as a result of his length of service. As a result, he headed the line of ambassadors accredited to the United States, and headed the Diplomatic Corps at occasions such as the second inauguration of President Roosevelt. Cassini's niece and adopted daughter, Marguerite, indeed, was close friends with President Roosevelt's eldest child, Alice, during much of Cassini's time in Washington. Upon his reaching fifty years of Imperial Service, in 1905, (then aged 68), Cassini received an autographed letter from Nicholas II of Russia and was awarded the Order of Saint Alexander Nevsky.

Edmund Morris describes Cassini's position in Washington as follows:

Amongst the most eventful issues to emerge during Cassini's tenure at Washington was an alleged plot to kill the emissary, which resulted in the Russian Legation in Washington being placed under armed guard for a period in 1904. No known effort was allegedly made on his life, however, it was rumoured that Russian nihilists and pro-Japanese sympathizers were behind the plot and Federal Authorities took it seriously enough for him to be accompanied by armed guards during a trip to the Opera in New York in October 1904. Although Cassini was said to have refused to believe the plot existed and the offer of protection, President Roosevelt himself was reported as having insisted on protection being extended.

Reports differ as to the reason for his withdrawal as Ambassador, with the New York Times reporting differences over the strategy to pursue peace with Japan following the Battle of Tsushima, but Morris charging that "Cassini, having lied to Roosevelt once too often, had been tactfully recalled by the Tsar". Whatever the reason, Cassini was recalled prior to the beginning of the peace talks which would lead to the Peace of Portsmouth.

Later life
Following the end of his service in the United States, Cassini was appointed as Russian Ambassador to Spain and posted to Madrid. As part of his duties there, he acted as signatory for the Russian Government to the agreement prepared following the Algeciras Conference on 7 April 1906.

Cassini retired in 1909, after having spent 55 years in the service of the Czar. He died in 1919 at age 83.

Honors and awards
For his service, Cassini was awarded decorations, including:
 Order of Saint Stanislaus, 1st degree (1884)
 Order of Saint Anna, 1st degree (1889)
 Order of Saint Vladimir, 2nd class (1895)
 Order of the White Eagle, (1898)
 Order of Saint Alexander Nevsky, (April 6, 1904); insignia in diamonds (December 18, 1904)
 Legion of Honour, Grand-croix (July 19, 1906)

See also
 History of Russia (1892–1917)

Notes

References

 This article is based, in part, on information available on the Russian Wikipedia :ru:Кассини, Артур Павлович

1836 births
1919 deaths
Russian people of Italian descent
Counts of the Russian Empire
Ambassadors of the Russian Empire to the United States
Deans of the Diplomatic Corps to the United States
Active Privy Councillor (Russian Empire)
Ambassadors of the Russian Empire to China
Italian nobility